The Academy of Media Arts Cologne (KHM) is an art and film school started 1990 in Cologne, Germany.

References

External links
Academy of Media Arts Website

 
Educational institutions established in 1990
Universities and colleges in Cologne
1990 establishments in Germany